Phalaenopsis difformis, also known as the dark brown Phalaenopsis, is a species of epiphytic orchid native to Assam, Borneo, China South-Central, China Southeast, East Himalaya, Laos, Malaya, Myanmar, Bangladesh, Nepal, Sumatera, Thailand, Vietnam and West Himalaya.

Taxonomy
This species has a complex taxonomic history and has been previously assigned to several genera. Within this species two variations, Phalaenopsis difformis var. difformis and Phalaenopsis difformis var. kinabaluensis (J.J.Wood, A.L.Lamb & Shim) Kocyan & Schuit., are formally recognized.

Description
The very short-stemmed plants bear few, coriaceous, elliptic-oblong, flat, spreading leaves between 7-16 cm in length and 3-4 cm in width. The flowers are of unusual shape for the genus and arise between late June to early July from pendulous, many-flowered, 20-30 cm long inflorescences, which exceed the leaves in length. The many-flowered inflorescences resemble a flying swarm of insects. The most striking feature is the unusual shape of the labellum. It is much longer than the sepals and the recurved side lobes have a pectinate (i.e. comb-like) margin. This species has often been found growing on Glochidion heyneanum var. heyneanum (syn. Glochidion velutinum) trees at altitudes of 20 m in evergreen forests.

Ecology
This species are lithophytes or epiphytes.

Etymology
The specific epithet difformis is derived from Latin meaning misshapen or illformed. This refers to the highly unusual labellum.

Conservation
The IUCN has not assessed this species conservation status. It is however protected unter the CITES appendix II regulations of international trade.

References

difformis
Orchids of Vietnam
Orchids of Indonesia
Orchids of Thailand
Orchids of Nepal
Orchids of Myanmar
Orchids of Laos
Orchids of Bangladesh
Orchids of India
Orchids of China
Epiphytic orchids
Lithophytic orchids